The tripod position or orthopneic position is a physical stance often assumed by people experiencing respiratory distress (such as chronic obstructive pulmonary disease) or who are simply out of breath (such as a person who has just run a sprint). In tripod position, one sits or stands leaning forward and supporting the upper body with hands on the knees or on another surface. Among medical professionals, a patient adopting the tripod position is considered an indication that the patient may be in respiratory distress. In the setting of chest pain without labored respirations, the tripod position may indicate acute pericarditis.

It has been thought that the tripod position optimizes the mechanics of respiration by taking advantage of the accessory muscles of the neck and upper chest to get more air into the lungs. With the position of the arms secure, contraction of the pectoralis results in elevation of the anterior wall of the chest.

Patients who are suffering from breathing difficulties may be placed in this position by nurses; the patient sits at the side of the bed with head resting on an over-bed table on top of several pillows.

References

Human positions
Symptoms and signs: Respiratory system